Oprea Păunescu (born 6 July 1936) is a Romanian rower. He competed at the 1964 Summer Olympics in Tokyo with the men's coxed pair where they came tenth.

References

1936 births
Living people
Romanian male rowers
Olympic rowers of Romania
Rowers at the 1964 Summer Olympics
Sportspeople from Bucharest
World Rowing Championships medalists for Romania
European Rowing Championships medalists